The Benninghofen House is a historic residence in Hamilton, Ohio, United States.  Constructed in the 1860s, this house has been named a historic site for its high-quality architecture.  Once the home of prominent Hamilton residents, it has been converted into a museum.

Constructed in 1862, the house was built for Hamilton lawyer Noah C. McFarland, who became a politician and public servant a few years later: he was the senator for the district encompassing Butler and Warren Counties from 1866 to 1868, and from 1881 to 1885 he was the commissioner of the federal General Land Office.  He only resided in the house for twelve years before selling it to John Benninghofen in 1874.  An immigrant from the German kingdom of Prussia, Benninghofen had established himself as a textile magnate in the 1850s, and by 1874 the firm of Benninghofen and Shuler had branched out into the paper-manufacturing business that later became a mainstay of the local economy.

Built of brick with iron elements, the Benninghofen House is a high-quality Italianate structure.  Among the clearest examples of the style are the windows and front porch: the windows (some paired and some single) feature rounded arches, while the porch features small columns with decorative elements both at top and bottom.  Some of the windows (more on the side than on the front) are rectangular instead of rounded; some of these feature complicated lintel constructions instead of simple frames.  Besides the "normal" porch surrounding the main entrance, the house includes a subsidiary second-story porch placed above the entrance to the main porch.  The hip roof covering the house is supported on all sides by bracketing, which combines to form a decorative cornice.  A metal fence with stone base separates the property from the sidewalk and street.

No longer a residence, the Butler County Historical Society maintains the Benninghofen House as a historic house museum. Some of the interior is maintained at its nineteenth-century appearance, although with minor changes such as the relocation of a painting from a hallway to the formal parlor.  Other parts have been converted for unrelated museum purposes, such as the basement, which holds a display depicting dentist's tools from the nineteenth century.  Yet other parts hold artifacts such as the Civil War battle flag of the 35th Ohio Infantry, which belonged to Hamilton resident Ferdinand Van Derveer.  The house has also attracted ghost hunters; a group visiting in early 2013 reported contacting John Benninghofen's wife and various other residents of early Hamilton, and locals frequently contact museum staff asking if it is haunted.

In 1973, the Benninghofen House was listed on the National Register of Historic Places, qualifying both because of its historic architecture and because of its connection to John Benninghofer.  It is one of sixteen Hamilton locations on the Register, and one of more than eighty countywide.

References

External links

 Butler County Historical Society

National Register of Historic Places in Butler County, Ohio
Houses completed in 1862
Buildings and structures in Hamilton, Ohio
Historic house museums in Ohio
Houses in Butler County, Ohio
Houses on the National Register of Historic Places in Ohio
Italianate architecture in Ohio
Museums in Butler County, Ohio
Reportedly haunted locations in Ohio
1862 establishments in Ohio